Langobardia Minor was the name that, in the Early Middle Ages, was given to the Lombard domains in central and southern Italy, corresponding to the duchies of Spoleto and Benevento. After the conquest of the Lombard kingdom by Charlemagne in 774, it remained under Lombard control.

After reaching Italy via Friuli in 568, the Lombards conquered a large portion of territory south of the Alps from the Byzantines. These lands, which did not constitute, at least initially, a uniform and contiguous domain, were grouped into two main areas: Langobardia Major, from the Alps to today's Tuscany, and Langobardia Minor, which included the domains south of the Byzantine territories (which, in the late 6th century, stretched from Rome to Ravenna through modern-day Umbria and Marche). The Exarchate of Ravenna was connected to Rome through a Byzantine corridor that went through Orvieto, Chiusi and Perugia and separated Langobardia Minor from Langobardia Major.

While Langobardia Major fragmented into many duchies and city-states, Langobardia Minor maintained, for the duration of the Lombard kingdom (568–774), a remarkable institutional stability, remaining divided into the two duchies of Spoleto and Benevento. They were formed immediately after Lombard penetration, in the 570s, and the first dukes were Faroald in Spoleto and Zotto in Benevento. In the beginning, the two duchies only included the inland areas, leaving control of the coastal areas to the Byzantines; only later (particularly during the reign of Agilulf, 591–616) were Lombard possessions extended to the coasts as well. Consequently, the entire Adriatic coast between the Byzantine strongholds of Ancona in the north and Otranto in the south became subjected to the two duchies. The Ionian and Tyrrhenian Seas, however, only partially fell under the authority of the duke of Benevento, who was never able to permanently occupy the city of Naples, the tip of Salento, the part of Calabria south of Cosenza and Crotone, or the city of Rome and its suburbs.

Sources
Paul Deacon, Historia Langobardorum (Storia dei Longobardi, Lorenzo Valla/Mondadori, Milan 1992)

Kingdom of the Lombards